Joubertina is a small town in the Kou-Kamma Local Municipality, Sarah Baartman District of the Eastern Cape province of South Africa.

Description
Town on the Wabooms River in the Langkloof, some 50 km north-west of Assegaaibos, 70 km south-east of Avontuur and 213 km from Port Elizabeth. Joubertina was founded and introduced into the Langkloof community in 1907. Having secured a portion of the farm Onzer, in between the villages of Krakeel and Twee Riviere (both founded in 1765), a property development was launched there under the initiative of the Dutch Reformed Church. As the sale of erven around a newly erected church building gradually got underway in 1907, the future town was named in honour of W A Joubert, minister of the Dutch Reformed Church in Uniondale between 1878 and 1893.

Joubertina is located on the R62 road in the Langkloof valley, approximately 5 km west of Twee Riviere, near the western extreme of the Eastern Cape.

The town has a station on the narrow gauge Avontuur Railway.

References

External links

 Routes.co.za Joubertina Travel Information

Populated places in the Kou-Kamma Local Municipality
Populated places established in 1907